Panaque nigrolineatus, the  royal panaque, royal plec, or royal pleco, is an herbivorous freshwater armored catfish native to Brazil, Colombia and Venezuela where it occurs in the Orinoco and Amazon basins. It is known for being one of the few fish that digest wood.

Anatomy and appearance

The royal panaque is closely related to the popular plecostomus catfish kept in many aquaria as an algae eater. While the royal panaque also eats algae, it is best known among biologists as being among the very few fish capable of eating and digesting wood. It does so using symbiotic gut bacteria. Royal panaques are light grey in colour patterned with dark grey squiggles. They have red eyes and the dorsal fins are edged with cream or gold. The body is encased in heavy armour, except for the belly, which is soft. This armour is made of strong plates of skin, not scales. Royal panaques can grow to 43 centimetres (17 in) in length. Because they are heavy and inflexible, they do not swim well, but they do have a strong sucker-like mouth that enables them to hold onto rocks and wood in fast flowing waters.

Taxonomy 
P. nigrolineatus is the type species of its genus.

There are currently two described subspecies: Panaque nigrolineatus laurafabiane  (Watermelon pleco) and P. n. nigrolineatus  (the nominate subspecies). P. n. laurafabiane is found in the Guaviare river in the southwest Orinoco basin. It is known as the 'Watermelon pleco' in the aquarium trade. This subspecies' wild population is under intense pressure from harvest for the ornamental fish trade.

Distribution and habitat
The royal panaque can be found in the Orinoco River as well as a number of tributaries of the Amazon River.

Varieties
There are several undescribed varieties of Panaque that are very similar to Panaque nigrolineatus and are commonly traded as aquarium fish. These may be regional variations, subspecies, or closely related species. All share the same basic colouration but vary in the shape and distribution of the stripes and the amount of cream or gold on the fins. These varieties are:
Panaque sp. cf. nigrolineatus 'Tapajos' (after the river from which it is collected)
Panaque sp. cf. nigrolineatus 'olive pleco'
Panaque sp. cf. nigrolineatus 'Tocantins' (after the river from which it is collected)
Panaque sp. cf. nigrolineatus 'Xingu' (after the river from which it is collected)
At least one variety, the 'watermelon pleco', has been described as a subspecies.

In the aquarium
The royal panaque is valuable as an aquarium fish. It is a very attractive aquarium fish which grows to a large size, with a maximum length of 43.0 centimeters in standard length. Maintenance is as for other Panaque, with the fish needing plenty of space, well oxygenated water, and a regular supply of vegetables and wood on which to feed. Young are often imported in an undernourished state and require dedicated attention to recover. Primarily nocturnal, this fish is generally shy under the light and will keep in hiding during the day. This fish is territorial, so a suitable resting area for this fiwsh is necessary. This species has not yet been bred in captivity.

References

External links
 
Planet Catfish
Panaque Research
Web streamable Ogg video of a royal panaque swimming and feeding in an aquarium

Ancistrini
Catfish of South America
Fish of the Amazon basin
Freshwater fish of Brazil
Freshwater fish of Colombia
Fish of Venezuela
Orinoco basin
Fish described in 1877
Taxa named by Wilhelm Peters